Disney Family Album is a half-hour documentary series on the Disney Channel that aired during the 1980s. It was narrated by Buddy Ebsen. The series looked at the artists and performers that help create Disney's movies and parks.

Episodes

References

External links

 Clip of Disney Family Album

1984 American television series debuts
1986 American television series endings
Television series by Disney
Disney Channel original programming